Bothriomyrmex is a genus of ants in the subfamily Dolichoderinae.

Distribution and habitat
The genus is widely distributed in the Old World and Australia, where it is found nesting in a wide range of habitats (including grasslands, savanna woodlands, mallee forests and lowland rainforest). They nest in soil or in rotten wood.

Species

Bothriomyrmex anastasiae Dubovikov, 2002
Bothriomyrmex atlantis Forel, 1894
Bothriomyrmex breviceps Santschi, 1919
Bothriomyrmex communistus Santschi, 1919
Bothriomyrmex corsicus Santschi, 1923
Bothriomyrmex costae Emery, 1869
Bothriomyrmex crosi Santschi, 1919
Bothriomyrmex cuculus Santschi, 1919
Bothriomyrmex decapitans Santschi, 1911
Bothriomyrmex emarginatus Santschi, 1919
Bothriomyrmex jannonei Menozzi, 1936
Bothriomyrmex kusnezovi Emery, 1925
Bothriomyrmex laticeps Emery, 1925
Bothriomyrmex meridionalis (Roger, 1863)
Bothriomyrmex modestus Radchenko, 1985
Bothriomyrmex paradoxus Dubovikoff & Longino, 2004
Bothriomyrmex pubens Santschi, 1919
Bothriomyrmex regicidus Santschi, 1919
Bothriomyrmex salsurae Donisthorpe, 1944
Bothriomyrmex saundersi Santschi, 1922
Bothriomyrmex syrius Forel, 1910
Bothriomyrmex turcomenicus Emery, 1925
Bothriomyrmex urartus Dubovikov, 2002

References

External links

 
Dolichoderinae
Ant genera